Benna is a comune (municipality) in the Province of Biella in the Italian region Piedmont, located about  northeast of Turin and about  southeast of Biella.

Benna borders the following municipalities: Candelo, Cossato, Massazza, Mottalciata, Verrone.

References

Cities and towns in Piedmont